Tommy Mollet (born 29 March 1979 in Tilburg) is a Dutch taekwondo practitioner. He competed in the 80 kg event at the 2012 Summer Olympics; after defeating Abdelrahman Ahmed in the preliminary round, he was eliminated by Arman Yeremyan in the quarterfinal.

References

1979 births
Living people
Dutch male taekwondo practitioners
Olympic taekwondo practitioners of the Netherlands
Taekwondo practitioners at the 2012 Summer Olympics
Sportspeople from Tilburg
European Taekwondo Championships medalists
20th-century Dutch people
21st-century Dutch people